Narwhal was a whaling ship, a barque which was part of the Arctic fleet between 1883 and 1907.

References

Further reading
  
 
 
 
 
  
  
  
  
 
 
 
 
 
   
 
  
 
 
 
 
 
 
 
 
 
 
 
 
 
 
 

Whaling ships
1883 ships